The 2013–14 season was the 82nd season in Málaga CF's history and their 33rd season in La Liga, the top division of Spanish football. The 2013–14 season covered the period from 1 July 2013 to 30 June 2014.

Málaga competed for an ambitious run in La Liga. They entered the Copa del Rey in the Round of 32. Their participation to the UEFA Europa League was denied by the Court of Arbitration for Sport.

Players

Squad information
The numbers are established according to the official website:www.malagacf.es and www.lfp.esUpdated 27 June 2013''

Transfers

In

Total expenditure: €3,360,000

Out

Total income:  €31,000,000

Club

Coaching staff

Pre-season and friendlies

Post-season friendlies

La Liga

Results summary

Results by round

Matches

Copa del Rey

Round of 32

Statistics

Goals

Last updated: 20 December 2013 
Source: Match reports in Competitive matches

References

External links
  

Malaga
Málaga CF seasons